The Warmer in the Winter Tour was a 2017 North American concert tour by violinist Lindsey Stirling. This was her fourth concert tour, and first Christmas tour celebrating her album Warmer in the Winter.

Background
In 2017, Stirling released the Christmas album Warmer in the Winter and toured during the festive season in North America. The tour had 31 dates, beginning in Albany, New York, on November 8 and concluding in Phoenix, Arizona, on December 23.

The tour offered a range of premium packages, including a meet-and-greet with Stirling who would also perform a private pre-show concert.

Set list
The following set list is that of the show in Las Vegas, Nevada, on December 22, 2017, not that of all the concerts of the tour.

 "All I Want for Christmas Is You"
 "Waiting for the Man With the Bag / Jingle Bell Rock"
 "Let It Snow! Let It Snow! Let It Snow!"
 "Warmer in the Winter"
 "I Saw Three Ships (Come Sailing In)"
 "Mini Set" (medley on toy instruments)
 "Hallelujah"
 "What Child Is This?"
 "Elements"
 "What Child Is This?"
 "Crystallize"
 "Dance of the Sugar Plum Fairy"
 "Carol of the Bells"
 "You're a Mean One, Mr. Grinch"
 "Christmas C'mon"

Encore
 "Silent Night"

Reception
Reception to the tour was overwhelmingly positive, with MTV describing it as "Lindsey Stirling wows on her 'warmer in the winter tour'" and advised fans to witness her magic. 

Diana Stevens of Burning Hot Events reviewed her final show in Phoenix, AZ with the comments "The “Warmer in the Winter” Tour was like a traveling snow globe, shaken up with a wonderland of lights, sounds, and dancing. Stirling touched hearts with her words and music, and spread smiles with her jokes and shining personality."

Tour dates

Personnel
Band
 Lindsey Stirling – violin
 Drew Steen – drums

References

External links
Official website

2017 concert tours
Lindsey Stirling concert tours